Psi Cassiopeiae (ψ Cassiopeiae) is a binary star system in the northern constellation of Cassiopeia.

The primary component, ψ Cassiopeiae A, is an orange K-type giant with an apparent magnitude of +5.0; it is a double star, designated CCDM J01259+6808AB, with a fourteenth magnitude star (component B) located 3 arcseconds from the primary. Located about 25 arcseconds distant there is a 9.8 magnitude optical companion CCDM J01259+6808CD, designated ψ Cassiopeiae B in older star catalogues, which is itself another double; CD comprises a 9.4 magnitude component C and a 10 magnitude component D.

References

K-type giants
Binary stars
4
Cassiopeiae, Psi
Cassiopeia (constellation)
Durchmusterung objects
Cassiopeiae, 36
008491
006692
0399